The Mohajir Qaumi Movement Pakistan formerly known as Mohajir Qaumi Movement (Haqiqi), MQM-Haqiqi is a political party claiming to represent the Mohajir in Sindh, Pakistan whose leader is Afaq Ahmed.

History 
The Movement was originally established by Afaq Ahmed & Altaf Hussain in 1978 as All Pakistan Mohajir Students Organization (APMSO), in Karachi University. Presently, the movement is known originally it was as "Muhajir Qaumi Movement", a break away faction from the original Mohajir Qaumi Movement which was later established  as "Muttahida Qaumi Movement", headed by Altaf Hussain, who is living in self-exile in London. In 2017, Muttahida Qaumi Movement was split and a separate party Muttahida Qaumi Movement – Pakistan was created by Farooq Sattar, who split it from MQM founder and leader Altaf Hussain and MQM-Altaf based faction was later started rendered as Muttahida Qaumi Movement – London. Later Farooq Sattar was expelled from MQM-P for violating party discipline policy. Some may relate his expulsion to the non-negotiable stance of giving a ticket to Kamran Tessori who was not very popular among other MQM leaders.

Controversies

Afaq Ahmed's imprisonment 
Ahmed was arrested in 2004 but, after almost eight years of imprisonment, the court had not found him guilty of any charges and, on 17 December 2011, the Sindh High Court declared that Ahmed's imprisonment under the "Maintenance of Public Order" provisions was illegal and ordered him to be set free. A crowd gathered outside of the jail to welcome their leader.

Urban Sindh Province 
Afaq Ahmed has raised voice for the creation of  so called “urban" or "South Sindh" province.

See also

Muttahida Qaumi Movement – London
Muttahida Qaumi Movement – Pakistan
Pak Sarzameen Party

References

External links
 Official website

Political parties in Pakistan